Jerry Ames (June 5, 1930 Brooklyn, New York, USA– February 7, 2011 Woodbury, New York, USA) was an American tap dancer centered in New York. In 1977, he co-authored The Book of Tap: Recovering America's Long Lost Dance with Jim Siegelman. In 1980, he was a featured performer in the movie Tap Dancin'  by Christian Blackwood. In 2006, he received a Flo Bert Award for his lifetime contribution to tap dance.

References

1930 births
2011 deaths
American tap dancers
People from Brooklyn